Zlatar Lake is an artificial lake located among the mountains of Zlatibor and Zlatar (mountain) 15 km from the town of Nova Varoš. The lake was created in the 1960s after the construction of a dam on the Uvac river, and covers an area of 7.25 square kilometers and reaches a maximum depth of 75 meters.

The region has a continental-Mediterranean climate and is an attractive destination for holidays and recreation; Water-sports. The lake is suitable for treatment of cardiovascular diseases. The lake rests 880 meters above sea level.

References

Lakes of Serbia